The 3C-like protease (3CLpro) or main protease (Mpro), formally known as C30 endopeptidase or 3-chymotrypsin-like protease, is the main protease found in coronaviruses. It cleaves the coronavirus polyprotein at eleven conserved sites. It is a cysteine protease and a member of the PA clan of proteases. It has a cysteine-histidine catalytic dyad at its active site and cleaves a Gln–(Ser/Ala/Gly) peptide bond.

The Enzyme Commission refers to this family as SARS coronavirus main proteinase (Mpro). The 3CL protease corresponds to coronavirus nonstructural protein 5 (nsp5). The "3C" in the common name refers to the 3C protease (3Cpro) which is a homologous protease found in picornaviruses.

Function 

The 3C-like protease is able to catalytically cleave a peptide bond between a glutamine at position P1 and a small amino acid (serine, alanine, or glycine) at position P1'. The SARS coronavirus 3CLpro can for instance self-cleave the following peptides:

The protease is important in the processing of the coronavirus replicase polyprotein. It is the main protease in coronaviruses and corresponds to nonstructural protein 5 (nsp5). It cleaves the coronavirus polyprotein at 11 conserved sites. The 3CL protease has a cysteine-histidine catalytic dyad at its active site. The sulfur of the cysteine acts as a nucleophile and the imidazole ring of the histidine as a general base.

Nomenclature 

Alternative names provided by the EC include 3CLpro, 3C-like protease, coronavirus 3C-like protease, Mpro, SARS 3C-like protease, SARS coronavirus 3CL protease, SARS coronavirus main peptidase, SARS coronavirus main protease, SARS-CoV 3CLpro enzyme, SARS-CoV main protease, SARS-CoV Mpro and severe acute respiratory syndrome coronavirus main protease.

As a treatment target 

The protease 3CLpro is a potential drug target for coronavirus infections due to its essential role in processing the polyproteins that are translated from the viral RNA. The X-ray structures of the unliganded SARS-CoV-2 protease 3CLpro and its complex with an α-ketoamide inhibitor provides a basis for design of α-ketoamide inhibitors for a treatment of SARS-CoV-2 infection.

A number of protease inhibitors being developed targeting 3CLpro and homologous 3Cpro, including CLpro-1, GC376, rupintrivir, lufotrelvir, PF-07321332, and AG7404. The intravenous administered prodrug PF-07304814 (lufotrelvir) entered clinical trials in September 2020. The orally-active follow-up drug PF-07321332 is in phase II/III clinical trials as a combination drug with ritonavir, and in November 2021, results were announced including 89% reduction in hospitalizations when given within three days after COVID-19 symptom onset. An ultralarge virtual screening campaign of 235 million molecules was able to identify a novel broad-spectrum inhibitor targeting the main protease of several coronaviruses.

Other 3C(-like) proteases 
3C-like proteases (3C(L)pro) are widely found in (+)ssRNA viruses. All of them are cysteine proteases with a chymotrypsin-like fold (PA clan), using a catalytic dyad or triad. They share some general similarities on substrate specificity and inhibitor effectiveness. They are divided into subfamilies by sequence similarity, corresponding to the family of viruses they are found in:
 This entry is the coronavirus 3CLpro.
 Picornaviridae have a picornavirus 3Cpro (MEROPS C03). This is the earliest-studied family.  Examples include the ones found in poliovirus and in rhinovirus (both are members of genus Enterovirus).
 Caliciviridae have a 3CLpro (MEROPS C37). Examples include the one found in Norwalk virus.

Additional members are known from Potyviridae and non-Coronaviridae Nidovirales.

See also 
 3CLpro-1
 Carmofur
 COVID Moonshot
 Ebselen
 EDP-235
 Ensitrelvir
 GC376
 GRL-0617
 Nirmatrelvir
 RAY1216
 Rupintrivir
 SIM0417
 Theaflavin digallate
 Tollovir
 Y180
 Tetrahydrocannabutol

References

Further reading

External links 
 
 Peptidase C30/C16 in coronavirus, . The MEROPS C16 one is the "papain-like" PL-PRO.

EC 3.4.22
Coronavirus proteins
Viral nonstructural proteins